Gogamedi is a village of religious importance in the Hanumangarh district of Rajasthan (India), 30 km from Nohar, Rajasthan, 20 km from Bhadra, Rajasthan, 80 km from Hisar, 245 km from Delhi and 359 km from Jaipur.

Gogamedi fair
A grand fair is held at Gogamedi in August in memory of Gogaji (from Dadrewa village in Churu district). The fair is held from the ninth day of the dark half of Bhaadra (Goga Navami) to the eleventh day of the dark half of the same month.

Location
Gogamedi is accessible on NH 65 from Chandigarh; go straight to Hisar (Haryana) (230 km) and from Hisar take the road to Bhadra (60 km) and Gogamedi lies around 25 km from Nohar on the way to Bhadra. From Delhi take the NH09 to Hisar (165 km) and from Hisar take the road to Bhadra-Nohar.

References

External links

Villages in Hanumangarh district
Hindu temples in Rajasthan